Bidens connata , the purplestem beggarticks or London bur-marigold, is a species of flowering plant in the family Asteraceae. It is widespread across much of Eurasia, North Africa, and North America, and naturalized in Australia and on certain Pacific Islands.

Bidens connata  is an annual  herb up to 200 cm (80 inches) tall. It produces as many as 3 yellow flower heads containing both disc florets and ray florets. The species grows in marshes and other wet sites.

References

External links

connata
Flora of Asia
Flora of Europe
Flora of North America
Flora of North Africa
Plants described in 1803
Taxa named by Carl Ludwig Willdenow